Kholoud Waleed is a Syrian journalist, and co-founder and editor of the underground newspaper Enab Baladi. She is a recipient of the Anna Politkovskaya Award for her reporting about the Syrian Civil War.

Early life 
Waleed grew up in Darayya and studied English Literature at Damascus University before becoming a teacher in her native Syria. As a result of the Darayya massacre, she left the town and fled to the countryside with her family.

Work as journalist and activism 
Not having any journalistic training, Waleed teamed up with friends to report about civil war in Syria. As their work gained momentum, they created the newspaper Enab Baladi with the intention of reporting the "voice of the vulnerable".

Waleed and the newspaper claim that they have been subject to threats from multiple parties involved in the war which prompted her to live in hiding. Her brother was arrested by government forces in 2012 and his fate is unknown. For a period of time she was exiled in Turkey.

Despite this, she also organised demonstrations, demanding democracy and free speech as well as highlighting human rights abuses.
In 2015 she was awarded the Anna Politkovskaya Award for her continued efforts as a journalist.

References 

Syrian journalists
Syrian women journalists
Living people
Year of birth missing (living people)
Place of birth missing (living people)